Greenleaf may refer to:

Places

United States

Inhabited places
 Greenleaf, California, former name of Gregg, California
 Greenleaf, Idaho
 Greenleaf, Kansas
 Greenleaf, Minnesota
 Greenleaf, Oregon
 Greenleaf, Wisconsin
 Greenleaf Township (disambiguation)

Other places in the US
 Greenleaf at Cheltenham, an outdoor shopping center in Philadelphia, Pennsylvania
 Greenleaf Hut, an Appalachian Mountain Club hut in the White Mountains of New Hampshire
 Greenleaf Peak, a mountain in the Cascade Range, Washington
 Greenleaf Point, former name of Buzzard Point, Washington, D.C.
 Greenleaf Lake (disambiguation)
 Greenleaf Lake State Recreation Area, Minnesota
 Greenleaf State Park, Oklahoma

Publishers 
Greenleaf Book Group, a publisher and book distributor (founded 1997), Austin, Texas, US
Greenleaf Publishing, a publisher of academic and professional books and journals (founded 1992), Yorkshire, UK
 Greenleaf Publishing (1950s–1970s), a publishing house founded by William Lawrence Hamling, Chicago, Illinois, US

Other uses 
 Greenleaf (automobile), American automobile produced in 1900s
 Greenleaf (band), Swedish rock band
 Greenleaf (name)
 "Greenleaf" (short story), a 1956 short story by Flannery O'Connor
 Greenleaf (TV series), a 2016 television drama series on OWN
 Greenleaf, Indiana, the fictional setting of the film In & Out
 Greenleaf five eyes (Chamaesaracha coronopus), a plant in the nightshade family
 Greenleaf Friends Academy, Greenleaf, Idaho
 Greenleaf manzanita (Arctostaphylos patula), a North American shrub
 Greenleaf Music, an independent American record label
 Legolas, a character of The Lord of the Rings by J. R. R. Tolkien, whose name is translated as "Greenleaf"
 Mills & Greenleaf, an American architectural firm in the early 20th New York City, New York, US

See also 
 Green leaf (disambiguation)